Exobasidium parvifolii is a species of fungus.

Description

Exobasidium parvifolii is a basidiomycete fungi in order Exobasidiales. It forms a systemic, perennial polycarpic infection of at least two species of Vaccinium; V. parvifolium and V. ovalifolium. E. parvifolii stimulates hosts to from cladomania, diseased accessory shoots, annually. Firm, vegetative galls form in the stams. In spring the stams produce up to 100 cylindrical excrescences. The fleshy protrusions eventually clad themselves with a hymenium. By early summer these turn to "shoe-string galls".

Range
Exobasidium parvifolii is found on northeastern Pacific coasts from Tlingit territory towards its northern extent to Salinan territory towards its southern extent.

Habitat
Exobasidium parvifolii grows in  wet, hypermaritime forested ecosystems where their Vaccinium hosts flourish.

Ecology

Etymology

Exobasidium parvifolii translates to "exorbitant inflection" in Latin.

Taxonomy

References

Ustilaginomycotina